Kazimierza Wielka is a town in Poland, in Świętokrzyskie Voivodeship, about  northeast of Kraków. It is the administrative seat of Kazimierza County (powiat kazimierski). With a population of 5,848 (2005),  it is the smallest county seat in Poland. Kazimierza Wielka is located in Lesser Poland Upland and historically belongs to the province of Lesser Poland. For most of its history, it was a village, and did not receive its town charter until 1959.

The first mention of the village dates from 1320 during the reign of Wladyslaw Lokietek. At that time, its name was spelled Cazimiria and it belonged to the Kazimierski family. In the Kingdom of Poland, Kazimierza Wielka was located on the border of two Lesser Poland voivodeships - Sandomierz Voivodeship and Krakow Voivodeship. The village itself belonged to Proszowice County of Kraków Voivodeship, while neighboring Kazimierza Mala belonged to Wislica County of Sandomierz Voivodeship. In the 1560s, Kazimierza Wielka was one of centers of the Polish Brethren. At the end of the 18th century the estate was the property of the magnate Łubieński family. They established there one of the first sugar refineries in Poland in 1845.

After the Partitions of Poland the village belonged to Austria and in 1815 it became part of Russian-controlled Congress Poland. In 1919, Kazimierza Wielka returned to Poland, within Kielce Voivodeship. On September 5, 1939, a skirmish between the advancing Wehrmacht and Polish 55th Infantry Division took place in the village in which 60 Polish soldiers died. In 1956 Kazimierza Wielka County was created, and three years later, the village received its town rights. Its most important historic building is a local parish church (1633).

Education
 Public High School in Kazimierza Wielka
 Hugon Kollataj Primary School No. 1
 John Paul II Primary School No. 3

International relations
 Buchach,

References

External links

 Official town website

Cities and towns in Świętokrzyskie Voivodeship
Kazimierza County
Kraków Voivodeship (14th century – 1795)
Kielce Governorate
Kielce Voivodeship (1919–1939)